The 2007 Tippeligaen was the 63rd completed season of top division football in Norway. The season began on 9 April 2007. Originally scheduled to end on 4 November, the last round was moved to Saturday 3 November 2007, due to Rosenborg’s Champions League participation.

Brann were confirmed as league champions after the 24th round of the season, after Stabæk lost away to Viking. The result left Brann with an unassailable seven-point lead over Viking, with two games left to play. Brann thus claimed their first league title since 1963, and their third league title in all. Stabæk eventually finished as runners-up, their strongest performance ever, while Viking finished third.

Sandefjord and Start ended the season at the bottom of the table and were relegated. The play-off spot was occupied by Odd Grenland for the second year in a row. They faced Bodø/Glimt over two games for the right to play in the 2008 Tippeligaen, but lost 4–2 on aggregate and were relegated, while Bodø/Glimt were promoted.

Teams
Fourteen teams competed in the league – the top twelve teams from the previous season, and two teams promoted from 1. divisjon.

Note: Table lists in alphabetical order.

League table

Relegation play-offsBodø/Glimt won 4–2 on aggregate and were promoted to the 2008 Tippeligaen.''

Results

Season statistics

Top scorers

Source: VG Nett

Discipline

Player
Most yellow cards: 7
 Lars Iver Strand (Tromsø)
Most red cards: 3
 Frode Kippe (Lillestrøm)

Club
Most yellow cards: 53
Sandefjord

Most red cards: 6
Lillestrøm

Attendances

Source: VG Nett

See also
2007 1. divisjon

Notes 

Eliteserien seasons
1
Norway
Norway